Peckoltia sabaji is a species of catfish in the family Loricariidae. It is native to South America, where it occurs in the basins of the Rupununi, the Essequibo River, and the Takutu River in Guyana, as well as the basins of the Casiquiare canal, the Rio Negro, the Cinaruco River, and the Orinoco in Venezuela. It is usually found among boulders in medium to large rivers. The species reaches 19.8 cm (7.8 inches) SL and is of disputed classification.

P. sabaji was originally placed in the genus Peckoltia by Jonathan W. Armbruster of Auburn University in 2003, although Armbruster transferred the species to the genus Hemiancistrus in 2008 following a review of Peckoltia, and Hemiancistrus sabaji is still accepted by sources such as FishBase. In 2015, Armbruster, alongside Nathan K. Lujan, Nathan R. Lovejoy, and Hernán López-Fernández, determined that P. sabaji should be moved out of Hemiancistrus and returned to Peckoltia, and a subsequent taxonomic review conducted later in 2015 by Armbruster, David C. Werneke, and Milton Tan affirms this reclassification. The species has also at various points been suggested to be a member of Ancistrus, Ancistomus (primarily a seemingly erroneous placement used in the aquarium trade), or possibly a new undescribed genus, although Peckoltia sabaji is the currently accepted name according to Armbruster, and it is also the name used by ITIS.

References

Loricariidae
Fish described in 2003
Taxa named by Jonathan W. Armbruster